The third Cowper ministry was the seventh ministry of the Colony of New South Wales, and third occasion of being led by Charles Cowper.

Cowper was elected in the first free elections for the New South Wales Legislative Assembly held in March 1856, and fought unsuccessfully with Stuart Donaldson to form Government. When Donaldson's Government faltered a little over two months after it was formed, Cowper formed Government on the first occasion, but he also lost the confidence of the Assembly a few months later. Cowper formed Government on the second occasion between 1857 and 1859; but it also lost the confidence of the Assembly. Cowper was again asked to form Government following the decision by Premier John Robertson to step aside and focus on land reform. Each of the ministers retained their portfolios from the first Robertson ministry, with the only change being that Cowper replaced Robertson as the leader.

The title of Premier was widely used to refer to the Leader of Government, but not enshrined in formal use until 1920.

There was no party system in New South Wales politics until 1887. Under the constitution, ministers were required to resign to re-contest their seats in a by-election when appointed, although in general the minister was re-elected unopposed. Because each of the ministers retained their appointments from the Robertson ministry, no by-elections were initially required. Charles Cowper Jr. was opposed at the 1861 by-election for The Tumut, but was comfortably re-elected. Thomas Smart (The Glebe) was re-elected unopposed in May 1863, following his appointment as Colonial Treasurer.

The appointment of John Darvall  as Attorney General in 1863 however was controversial, not only as he was a conservative appointed to the liberal ministry, but because John Hargrave, who had been Attorney General since March 1860, accepted the lesser role of Solicitor General to allow Darvall to be appointed. Darvall was challenged by his friend Henry Parkes at the East Maitland by-election in a campaign marked by person attacks.

This ministry covers the period from 10 January 1861 until 15 October 1863, when Cowper was defeated amidst criticism of the ministry's financial management.

Composition of ministry

 
Ministers are members of the Legislative Assembly unless otherwise noted.

See also

Self-government in New South Wales
Members of the New South Wales Legislative Assembly, 1860–1864
First Cowper ministry (1856)
Second Cowper ministry (1857–1859)
Fourth Cowper ministry (1865–1866)
Fifth Cowper ministry (1870)

References

 

New South Wales ministries
1861 establishments in Australia
1863 disestablishments in Australia